The Duquesne University Red Masquers are the oldest amateur theatre company in the city of Pittsburgh. Known as the Red Masquers since 1914, the company can trace its roots back to the late 19th century when Duquesne first started to offer courses in drama. The name Red Masquers refers to Masques, a form of European court entertainment in the 17th century, and the "red" of course representing Duquesne's colors.

Membership
The group is constituted by a mixture of Duquesne students from all majors, including pharmacy, business, communications, English, education and more. Membership is open to all students in good academic standing.

Performances
The Masquers put on a variety of plays throughout the year, annually performing three main-stage plays, generally consisting of one classical, one modern, and one contemporary. One of these main stage plays is an alumni show in which former members of the Red Masquers are invited to participate.  Additionally, they perform two sets of One-act plays. In the winter, "One Acts for Charity," which consists of performing professional playwright one-act plays directed by students. In the spring, the company performs "Premieres," which are student-written and student directed plays. The group has also participated in the Pittsburgh Monologue Project.

The Red Masquers celebrated their 100th Season during the 2012-13 School Year. To commemorate this, all of their performances that year were world premieres.

Though the Red Masquers have had many homes over the years, they currently perform in a new black box theater built in 2015.

Awards
The Red Masquers won the "Outstanding Production" Award for "Moon Over Gomorrah" for the 2013 Pittsburgh New Works Festival.

See also
 Theatre in Pittsburgh

References

Duquesne University
Theatre companies in Pittsburgh